The El Tambor Fault is an inactive dextral oblique thrust fault in the departments of Cauca and Valle del Cauca in Colombia.

Etymology 
The fault is named after Cerro El Tambor, Timbiquí, Cauca.

Description 
The El Tambor Fault borders the western slope of the Western Ranges of the Colombian Andes, west of the Farallones de Cali. Through most of its trace, the fault places Cretaceous volcanic and sedimentary rocks on the east, against Neogene rocks on the west, which commonly crops out across most of the plains of the Pacific Coast. The fault displays strong linear topographic features, tectonic control of drainage, and deflected stream channels and was active in the Late Pleistocene or Early Holocene.

See also 

 List of earthquakes in Colombia
 Romeral Fault System

References

Bibliography

Maps 
 
 

Seismic faults of Colombia
Thrust faults
Strike-slip faults
Inactive faults
Faults
Faults